Bossiaea barrettiorum is a species of flowering plant in the family Fabaceae and is endemic to a restricted area in the Northern Kimberley region of Western Australia. It is low, spreading or prostrate shrub with winged stems, winged cladodes, leaves reduced to small scales, and deep yellow and red flowers.

Description

Taxonomy and naming
Bossiaea barrettiorum was first formally described in 2006 by James Henderson Ross in the journal Muelleria, from specimens collected by Matthew David Barrett near the Prince Regent River in 2001. The specific epithet (barrettiorum) honours the collector of the type specimens.

Distribution and habitat
This bossiaea is only known from two populations north of the Prince Regent River, growing in sand between sandstone rocks in the North Kimberley biogeographic region of northern Western Australia.

Conservation status
Bossiaea barrettiorum is classified as "Priority Two" by the Western Australian Government Department of Parks and Wildlife meaning that it is poorly known and from only one or a few locations.

References

barrettiorum
Eudicots of Western Australia
Plants described in 2006